Udmurt State University (Udmurtian Удмурт кун университет) is a public university in the city of Izhevsk, Russia. Established in 1931, UdSU is the oldest educational institution in Udmurt Republic. In 1993, it was named among top twenty classical Russian universities, since then consistently ranks 14-16 out of 64 Russian universities.

 over 28,000 students are enrolled at the Udmurt State University, which offers 86 different majors.  About 9,200 of them are full-time undergraduates.

History
Udmurt State University is the oldest educational institution in the Udmurt Republic.  It was originally established as Udmurt State Pedagogical Institute in 1931.  Prior to World War II the Institute's main goal was defining the key elements of its organizational structure.  UdSPI have grown tremendously after the end of the war, and by 1958 the Institute opened its own Graduate School with several Ph.D. awarding committees.  The institution has evolved  and expanded substantially in the 1960s;  it ranked among top ten Soviet institutions of its class.  As a result, in April 1971 Udmurt State Pedagogical Institute officially became Udmurt State University.

Organizational structure

The main campus is on Udmurtskaya street in Izhevsk.  Six main buildings and several dormitories occupy prominent position in the center of the city.

 the University has 14 departments and 7 institutes.

Humanities
Sociology and Philosophy Department
History Department
Philology Department
Udmurt Philology Department
Physical Education Department
Journalism Department
Professional Foreign Languages Department
Arts and Design Institute
Foreign Languages and Literature Institute
Pedagogy, Psychology, and Social Technologies Institute
Social Communications Institute
Law, Public Administration and Safety Institute
Institute of Economics and Management

Sciences
Geography Department
Biology and Chemistry Department
Mathematics Department
Physics Department

Engineering
Public Safety Institute
Oil and Gas Industry Department
Computer Sciences and Technologies Department
Medical Biotechnologies Department

Regional campuses
In addition to the main campus in Izhevsk, The Udmurt State University also has several other campuses to service other parts of the Udumurt Republic. In the Udmurt Republic, there are campuses located in Votkinsk, Sarapul, Mozhga, and Debessy.  Outside Udmurtia, there are campuses in Kudymkar, Gubkinsky, Naberezhnye Chelny and Nizhnyaya Tura.

Faculty
Out of almost 1,000 faculty members 130 hold Doctors of sciences (Dr.Sc.]) degrees, and 460 are candidates of sciences (Ph.D.).

190 faculty members are Associate Professors and 45 Full Professors.

Graduate school
UdSU graduate school offers 11 Ph.D. committees qualified to award Ph.D. and Dr.Sc. degrees in ecology, economics, law, psychology, pedagogics, ethnology, history, culture, linguistics of the Ural region, and Udmurt linguistics.

Research
Historically, the strongest programs at the Udmurt State University were the ones specializing in pedagogy and education.  Yet since the 1960s UdSU has significantly diversified the scope of its scientific activity, and is currently offering up to 10 subfields of study within the most popular areas of research.

As of 2006 UdSU has 11 research subdivisions:
Botanical Gardens
Natural and Techogenic Catastrophes Institute
Humanitarian Institute
Udmurt Department of Russian Philosophical Society
Applied Ecology Institute
Educational Technologies Institute
Gender Studies Center
Ecology Studies Center
Educational Center "Resonance Technologies"
Multimedia and Internet Technologies Center
Intellectual Property and Information Division

In 2005, Udmurt State University held 34 conferences with 4083 participants, while UdSU faculty members and students presented at 167 international conferences outside the institution.  An international research conference dedicated to the 75th Anniversary of the UdSU took place in September 2006.

Several issues of "Vestnik UdSU" journal present faculty members and students research papers every year.

Student facilities and life
The Fundamental Library of the Udmurt State University first opened in 1931.   its fund contains over 700,000 units of conservation in both Russian and foreign languages.  The library divisions occupy parts in two of the six university main buildings.  A new separate library building is currently under construction. 

Since 1995 students and faculty members enjoy free access to electronic databases, full-text electronic publications, and a spacious media room for independent on-line research opened in 2000.  Librarians put up thematic book exhibitions available to general public as well as students and faculty several times a year.

Udmurt State University is a home for three very distinct museums.  Opened in the 1960s Natural History Museum of The Animal Ecology Department still remains a valuable resource for biology and zoology students.  It has three main exhibitions:  mineralogy, paleontology, and zoology.

Although the initial research for the Museum of Ancient and Medieval History of the Kama and Vyatka Region started in 1973, museum officially began its work only in 1980.  For over 30 years UdSU faculty and students majoring in history and archaeology have participated in studying over 1,500 historical sites in both Udmurt Republic and neighboring regions.

Museum of Arts and Art Gallery established in 1991 showcases paintings, sculptures, and other art works created by UdSU students, faculty, and professional artists of the Udmurt Republic.

Student Internet Center at the Udmurt State University sponsored by “Open Society” program was one of the first of its kind to open in Russian Universities in 1997.   it still offers wider internet access than any other facility in Udmurt Republic and provides informational support for the State Departments of the republic, as well as several large regional plants.

Founded in May 1998 The Center for American Studies (Центр американистики) attempts to familiarize UdSU students and faculty members with American culture.  Besides various programs devoted to interdisciplinary studies of contemporary American culture, coordinated by both Russian and American specialists from the University of Central Florida, the Center offers tutoring for TOEFL test and Computer Training courses.

Similarly, The Center for Spanish Language and Culture (Центр испанского языка и культуры) popularizes Spanish and Latin American cultural heritage since 1998.  Besides teaching Spanish to UdSU students and faculty, staff members of the Center for Hispanic Studies organize a wide array of popular with the students cultural events.  These include but are not limited to ethnic festivals, Spanish music parties, and seminars on Latino cinematography.

References

External links

Udmurt State University Russian Site
Udmurt State University English Site

Universities in Volga Region
Izhevsk
Izhevsk
Educational institutions established in 1931
Buildings and structures in Udmurtia
1931 establishments in the Soviet Union